Mallorysville is an unincorporated community in Wilkes County, in the U.S. state of Georgia.

History
Mallorysville was named after William Mallory, a county official. The Mallorysville post office closed in 1903.

The Georgia General Assembly incorporated Mallorysville as a town in 1819. The town's municipal charter was repealed in 1995.

References

Former municipalities in Georgia (U.S. state)
Unincorporated communities in Wilkes County, Georgia
Unincorporated communities in Georgia (U.S. state)
Populated places disestablished in 1995